Ficus lyrata, commonly known as the fiddle-leaf fig, is a species of flowering plant in the mulberry and fig family Moraceae. It is native  to western Africa, from Cameroon west to Sierra Leone, where it grows in lowland tropical rainforest.

The fruit is a green fig 2.5–3 cm (1-¼ in) diameter.

Cultivation and garden uses
It is a popular ornamental tree in subtropical and tropical gardens, and is also grown as a houseplant in temperate areas, where it usually stays shorter and fails to flower or fruit. It requires indirect natural light.

This plant has gained the Royal Horticultural Society's Award of Garden Merit.

Indoor use 

A commonly tricky houseplant despite its popularity, the fiddle-leaf fig does not respond well to being moved, especially from a spot where it is thriving. Being a tropical plant, it does not tolerate cold temperatures well or survive prolonged freezes. Proper drainage, adequate sunlight (direct but not harsh), and misting with water will help keep a fiddle-leaf fig bright green with its signature glossy finish.

Humidity and Temperature Requirements 
The optimal relative humidity for the Fiddle-Leaf Fig is between 25%-49%, but it can tolerate lower humidity. When it comes to the temperature requirements, the optimal temperature for the Fiddle-Leaf Fig is between 65°F- 75°F (18°C- 24°C).

Light Requirements 
Grown indoors, light is the most limiting factor for Ficus Lyrata. It is a full sun plant (it grows in direct sun most of the day in the natural habitat), but it can also grow well indoors in bright indirect light.

Soil Requirements 
The best potting soil for Ficus Lyrata is a well-draining and porous soil mix. It should have a soil pH between 5.5 and 7.0. A good, well-draining potting soil will provide enough macronutrients to the Fiddle-Leaf Fig and help it thrive and grow.

Propagation 
Ficus Lyrata can be propagated in multiple ways:

 By division
 By stem cuttings, and
 By air layering

See also
 List of lyrate plants

References

External links
Figweb: Ficus lyrata
 Care
 Ficus Lyrata benefits
 All about how to fertilize Ficus lyrata
Huxley, A., ed. (1992). New RHS Dictionary of Gardening. Macmillan.
 

 

lyrata
House plants
Garden plants
Ornamental trees